Norodom Rattana Devi (born 18 June 1974) is a Cambodian princess and politician.  She is the only daughter of Prince Norodom Ranariddh and Princess Norodom Marie. She belongs to FUNCINPEC and was elected to represent Kratie Province in the National Assembly of Cambodia in 2003. She shares her birthday with Queen Mother Norodom Monineath.

References

Members of the National Assembly (Cambodia)
1974 births
Cambodian princesses
House of Norodom
FUNCINPEC politicians
Living people
Children of prime ministers of Cambodia
People from Aix-en-Provence
Cambodian politicians of Chinese descent
French people of Chinese descent 
French people of Cambodian descent
20th-century Cambodian women
21st-century Cambodian politicians
21st-century Cambodian women politicians
University of Provence alumni